Eupragia is a moth genus of the family Depressariidae.

Species
 Eupragia hospita Hodges, 1969
 Eupragia banis Hodges, 1974
 Eupragia oxinopa Meyrick, 1929
 Eupragia solida Walsingham, 1911

References

 
Depressariinae
Taxa named by Thomas de Grey, 6th Baron Walsingham
Moth genera